Promoter activity  is a term that encompasses several meanings around the process of gene expression from regulatory sequences —promoters and enhancers. Gene expression has been commonly characterized as a measure of how much, how fast, when and where this process happens. Promoters and enhancers are required for controlling where and when a specific gene is transcribed.

Traditionally the measure of gene products (i.e. mRNA, proteins, etc.) has been the major approach of measure promoter activity. However, this method confront with two issues: the stochastic nature of the gene expression and the lack of mechanistic interpretation of the thermodynamical process involved in the promoter activation.

The actual developments in metabolomics product of developments of next-generation sequencing technologies and molecular structural analysis have enabled the development of more accurate models of the process of promoter activation (e.g. the sigma structure of the polymerase holoenzyme domains) and a better understanding of the complexities of the regulatory factors involved.

Promoter binding 
The process of binding is central in determining the "strength" of promoters, that is the relative estimation of how "well" a promoter perform the expression of a gene under specific circumstances. Brewster et al., using a simple thermodynamical model based on the postulate that transcriptional activity is proportional to the probability of finding the RNA polymerase bound at the promoter, obtained predictions of the scaling of the RNA polymerase binding energy. This models support the relationship between the probability of binding and the output of gene expression

Mathematical representation of promoter binding 
The problem of gene regulation could be represented mathematically as the probability of n molecules   — RNAP, activators, repressors and inducers  — are bound to a target regions.

To compute the probability of bound, it is needed to sum the Boltzmann weights over all possible states of  polymerase molecules

on DNA.  Here in this deduction    is the effective number of RNAP molecules available for binding to the promoter.

This approach is based in statistical thermodynamics of two possible microscopic outcomes:  
 one state where all P polymerases molecules are distributed among all the non-specific sites (sites not participating in gene expression)  
 a promoter occupied and the remaining P-1 polymerases distributed among the non-specific sites.

The statistical weight of promoter unoccupied Z(P) is defined:

Where the first term is the combinatorial result of taken   polymerase of   non-specific sites available, and the second term are the Boltzmann weights, where  is the energy that represents the average binding energy of RNA polymerase to the genomic background (non-specific sites).

Then, the total statistical weight , can be written as the sum of the  state and the RNA polymerase on promoter state:

Where  in the  state is the binding energy for RNA polymerase on the promoter (where the s stands for specific site).

Where,  

An important result of this model is that any transcription factor, regulator or perturbation could be introduced as a term multiplying  in the probability of binding equation. This term for any transcriptional factor (here called factor regulators) modify the probability of binding to:

This result has an important significance to represent mathematically all the possible configurations of transcriptional factor by derive different models to estimate  (for further developments, see also ).

Eukaryotes promoter structure

The process of activation and binding in eukaryotes is different from bacteria in the way that specific DNA elements bind the factors for a functional pre-initiation complex. In bacteria there is a single polymerase, that contain catalytic subunits and a single regulatory  subunits known as sigma, which transcribe for different type of genes.

In eukaryotes, the transcription is performed by three different RNA polymerase, RNA pol I for ribosomal RNAs (rRNAs), RNA polymerase II for messenger RNAs (mRNAs) and some small regulatory RNAs, and the RNA polymerase III for small RNAs such as transfer RNAs (tRNAs). The process of positioning of the RNA polymerase II and the transcriptional machinery require the recognition of a region known as "core promoter". The elements that could be found in the core promoter include the TATA element, the TFIIB recognition element (BRE), the initiator (Inr), and  the downstream core promoter element (DPE). Promoters in eukaryotes contain one or more of these core promotes elements (but any of them are absolutely essential for promoter function), these elements are binding sites for subunits of the transcriptional machinery and are involve in the initiation of the transcription, but also they have some specific enhancer functions. In addition, the promoter activity in eukaryotes include some complexities in the way of how they integrate signals from distal factors  with the core promoter.

Evolutionary processes 
Unlike in protein coding regions, where the assumption of  sequence conservation of functionally homologous genes have been frequently proved, there is not a clear relationship of conservation between sequences and their functions for regulatory regions. The transcriptional promoters regions are under less stringent selection, then have a higher substitutions rates, allowing transcription factor binding sites to be replaced easily be new ones arising from random mutations. Notwithstanding the sequence changes, mainly  the functions of regulatory sequences remain conserved.

In recents years with the increase of availability of genome sequences, phylogenetic footprinting open the possibility to identify cis-elements, and then study their evolution processes. In this sense, Raijman et al., Dermitzakis et al. have developed techniques for analyzing evolutionary processes in transcription factor regions in Saccharomyces species promoters and mammalian regulatory networks respectively.

The basis for many of these evolutionary changes in nature are probably related with events within the cis-regulatory regions involve in gene expression. The impact of variation in regulatory regions is important for disease risk due their impact in the gene expression level. Furthermore, perturbations in the binding properties of proteins encoded by regulatory genes have been linked with phenotypes effects such as, duplicated structures, homeotic transformations and novel morphologies.

Measure of promoter activity 
The measure of the promoter activity has a broad meaning. The promoter activity could be measured for different situations or research questions, such as:
 estimation of the level of expression in comparison (relative) to some known value 
 how fast a gene is expressed after induction 
 the timing of expression relative to others genes 
 the specific spatial location of expression 
Methods to study promoter activity commonly are based in the expression of a reporter gene from the promoter of the gene of interest. Mutations and deletions are made in a promoter region, and their changes on couple expression of the reporter gene are measured.

The most important reporter genes  are the fluorescence proteins as GFP. These reporters allow to measure promoter activation by increasing fluorescent signals, and deactivation by decrease in the rate of fluorescence.

See also 

 Enhancer (genetics)
 Glossary of gene expression terms
 cis-Regulatory element
 Transcription factor
 RNA polymerase

References 

Gene expression
Evolutionary biology